Stuart McInally (born 9 August 1990) is a Scottish rugby union player who is currently plays for Scottish United Rugby Championship side Edinburgh Rugby.

Beginning his career primarily at number eight and occasionally at flanker, McInally announced in August 2013 that he was focusing on a conversion to hooker.

Career

McInally made his Edinburgh debut in 2010, and became a regular in the team over the subsequent three seasons. In 2013 it was announced that he would be making the transformation from flanker to hooker, then in 2014 RFU Championship side Bristol Rugby signed him on loan. He made his competitive debut in his new position for Edinburgh in early 2015, and was called up to the Scotland squad for the 2015 summer tests. After securing his first caps in the double-header victories against Italy, McInally was named in the final 31-man squad for the 2015 Rugby World Cup by Head Coach Vern Cotter. In 2018 he captained the Scotland team against Argentina in a match which ended 44–15 to Scotland. However he then had to withdraw from the squad through injury and was replaced by Kevin Bryce.

In January 2016 McInally signed a contract extension with Edinburgh. In August 2016, Edinburgh Rugby named him and Grant Gilchrist as their co-captains for the coming season.

References

External links
 
 profile at Edinburgh Rugby
 profile at Scottish Rugby

1990 births
Living people
Rugby union hookers
People educated at George Watson's College
Commonwealth Games rugby sevens players of Scotland
Rugby sevens players at the 2010 Commonwealth Games
Scotland international rugby union players
Bristol Bears players
Scottish rugby union players
Edinburgh Rugby players
Rugby union players from Edinburgh